The White Horseman is a 1921 American silent Western film serial directed by Albert Russell. The serial consisted of eighteen episodes and is now is considered lost although some print clippings are known to have survived.

Cast
 Art Acord as Wayne Allen / The White Horseman
 Eva Forrestor as Jean Ramsey (as Iva Forrester)
 Duke R. Lee as John Ramsey / Sam Ramsey / The Mummy Man
 Beatrice Dominguez as Zona
 Hank Bell as The White Spider
 Tote Du Crow as Cuevas
 Marie Tropic as Onava

Chapters
 Cave of Despair 
 The Spider's Web 
 The Mummy Man 
 The Death Trap 
 Trails of Treachery 
 Furnace of Fear 
 Brink of Eternity 
 Pit of Evil 
 The Opal Bracelet 
 In the Enemy's Hands 
 A Race with Death 
 The Bridge of Fear 
 The Hill of Horror 
 A Jest of Fate 
 A Conquest of Courage 
 Fire of Fury 
 The Wings of Destiny 
 The Avenging Conscience

See also
 List of film serials
 List of film serials by studio

References

External links

 

1921 films
1921 lost films
1921 Western (genre) films
American silent serial films
American black-and-white films
Films directed by Albert Russell
Lost Western (genre) films
Lost American films
Silent American Western (genre) films
Universal Pictures film serials
1920s American films